Kureliya is a village in the Navsari District of Gujarat, India. It is located in the Vansda taluka.

Kureliya Pin code is 396590 and postal head office is Unai.

Kelkutch, Dharampuri, Holipada, Bhinar, Kukda are the nearby villages to Kureliya. Kureliya is surrounded by Mahuva Taluka towards west, Vyara Taluka towards north, Chikhali Taluka towards west, Valod Taluka towards north.

Vyara, Dharampur, Songadh, Navsari are the nearby cities to Kureliya.

Kureliya has a total population of 3,033 people. There are about 640 houses in Kureliya village.

Demographics

Kureliya local language is Gujarati. Kureliya Village total population is 3033 and number of houses are 640. Female population is 50.7%. Village literacy rate is 70.8% and the female literacy rate is 32.7%.

References

Villages in Navsari district